Dusun Malang, or Malang, is a language spoken by the Dusun people of Borneo. It is closely related to the Malagasy language.

References 

East Barito languages
Languages of Indonesia
Endangered Austronesian languages